Matías Ferreira (born 1 January 1997) is a Portuguese professional footballer who plays as a defender.

Club career
On 27 July 2018, Ferreira made his professional debut with Red Star in a 2018–19 Ligue 2 match against Chamois Niortais.

International career
Born in France, Ferreira is of Portuguese descent. He was called up to a training camp for the Portugal U18s in October 2014.

References

External links

1997 births
Living people
People from Les Lilas
Footballers from Seine-Saint-Denis
Association football defenders
Portuguese footballers
Portugal youth international footballers
French footballers
French people of Portuguese descent
Ligue 2 players
Championnat National players
Red Star F.C. players
F.C. Paços de Ferreira players